The 1980–81 Liga Bet season saw Hapoel Migdal HaEmek, Beitar Haifa, Hapoel Azor and Hapoel Yeruham win their regional divisions and promoted to Liga Alef.

At the bottom, Hapoel Kfar Kama, Beitar Kiryat Shmona (from North A division), Hapoel Kiryat Yam, Beitar Binyamina (from North B division), Maccabi Ramla, Beitar Herzliya (from South A division), Maccabi Shikun HaMizrah and Beitar Ashdod (from South B division) were all automatically relegated to Liga Gimel.

North Division A

North Division B

South Division A

South Division B

References
Saturday at Bet leagues (Page 7) Hadshot HaSport, 24.5.81, archive.football.co.il 
Goals celebrations of the promoted to Liga Alef, Liga Bet (Page 6) Hadshot HaSport, 31.5.81, archive.football.co.il 

Liga Bet seasons
Israel
4